The Dancers of Arun is a fantasy novel by American writer Elizabeth A. Lynn, published in 1979.

Plot summary
The Dancers of Arun is a novel that is the second part of The Chronicles of Tornor series.

Reception
Greg Costikyan reviewed The Dancers of Arun in Ares Magazine #5 and commented that "The primary thrust of the novels is their Message: that we can live in harmony, that capitalism is not necessary since we can all share in love and wonderfulness, and that all problems can be solved if we have the courage to be human. Nice enough, but hardly earth-shattering."

Kirkus Reviews states "Lynn is to be admired for attempting serious things in the fantasy genre, but here nothing quite works: the settings remain faceless despite any amount of description; the love story awkwardly combines homosexual incest and drenching sentimentality; and Lynn's prose style is laconic to the point of numbness. A gifted writer, gone much astray."

Reviews
Review by Baird Searles (1979) in Isaac Asimov's Science Fiction Magazine, September 1979 
Review by Orson Scott Card (1980) in Destinies, Spring 1980
Review by Michael Bishop (1980) in The Magazine of Fantasy & Science Fiction, June 1980
Review by Darrell Schweitzer (1980) in Science Fiction Review, August 1980
Review by Ian Williams (1980) in Paperback Inferno, Volume 4, Number 2
Review [French] by Emmanuel Jouanne (1982) in Fiction, #331
Review by Marleen S. Barr [as by Marleen Barr] (1982) in Extrapolation, Spring 1982
Review [German] by Andreas Decker (1983) in Science Fiction Times, Juni 1983

References

1979 American novels
1979 fantasy novels